Celo Knob is the northernmost major peak in the Black Mountains of western North Carolina. It is located just north of  Mount Mitchell State Park in the Pisgah National Forest.  It is the first peak encountered while hiking the Black Mountain Crest Trail from Bowlens Creek. The trail passes to the southwest of the summit, which can be reached by various herd paths.

See also
List of mountains in North Carolina

References

External links

 
 
 
 
 
 http://adventures.garmin.com/en-US/by/mepwoods/black-mountain-crest-trail-traverse-5-october-2013/

Pisgah National Forest
Mountains of North Carolina
Southern Sixers
Protected areas of Yancey County, North Carolina
Landmarks in North Carolina
Mountains of Yancey County, North Carolina